Jesús Zúñiga Romero (born 3 June 1949) is a Mexican politician affiliated with the New Alliance Party. As of 2014 he served as Deputy of the LIX Legislature of the Mexican Congress representing Coahuila.

References

1949 births
Living people
Politicians from Coahuila
New Alliance Party (Mexico) politicians
Deputies of the LIX Legislature of Mexico
Members of the Chamber of Deputies (Mexico) for Coahuila